Bedrock is an EP by The Foetus All-Nude Revue released by Self Immolation/Some Bizzare in 1987.

Bedrock is Self Immolation #WOMB FAN 13.

Track listing 

Tracks 1–4 appear on Sink.

Personnel 
Charles Gray – engineering
Warne Livesy – engineering
J. G. Thirlwell (as The Foetus All-Nude Revue) – instruments, production, illustrations

Charts

References

External links 
 
 Bedrock at foetus.org

1987 EPs
Foetus (band) albums
Albums produced by JG Thirlwell
Some Bizzare Records EPs